The Bodø/Glimt 2014 season was Bodø/Glimt's first season back in the Tippeligaen since their relegation at the end of the 2009 season. Bodø/Glimt finished the season in 13th place and where knocked out of the Norwegian Cup by Stabæk in the Fourth Round.

Squad

Out on loan

Transfers

In

Loans in

Out

Loans out

Released

Competitions

Tippeligaen

Results summary

Results by round

Results

Table

Norwegian Cup

Squad statistics

Appearances and goals

|-
|colspan="14"|Players away from Bodø/Glimt on loan:

|-
|colspan="14"|Players who appeared for Bodø/Glimt no longer at the club:
|}

Goal scorers

Clean sheets

Disciplinary record

References

FK Bodø/Glimt seasons
FK Bodo Glimt